Humes Preparatory Academy Middle School, formerly the L. C. Humes High School, is a middle school located in Memphis, Tennessee.  It has also been known as North Side High School and as L.C. Humes Junior High School.  It was open as a high school from the 1930s through 1967 and later became a middle school in the Memphis City Schools district. In 2004, the school was listed on the National Register of Historic Places for "its significance in education to Memphis, Tennessee and its Collegiate Gothic design", the latter the work of noted architect George Awsumb.

The school also has a connection to Elvis Presley, who graduated from the school in 1953. The school has numerous alumni from nearby Porter-Leath from its days as an orphanage and current foster care facility.

In 2012, the school opened as a charter school run by Gestalt Community Schools. In 2017 it was announced that control of the school would be transferred to Frayser Community schools when Gestalt would exit after experiencing declining enrollment and funding.

Notable alumni
 Bill Black
 John Bramlett
 Jack Cristil
 George Klein
 Elvis Presley
 Red West

References

External links
 
 Shelby County Schools
 Humes High School Class of 1953 (with photos of Humes in 1953) 
 Humes High, Class of 1953 - Comments from Elvis' classmates
 Humes High School info

School buildings on the National Register of Historic Places in Tennessee
School buildings completed in 1924
Educational institutions in the United States with year of establishment missing
1967 disestablishments in Tennessee
Schools in Memphis, Tennessee
1924 establishments in Tennessee
National Register of Historic Places in Memphis, Tennessee
Charter schools in Tennessee